Ashok Khemka (अशोक खेमका) is an Indian civil service bureaucrat. He is an Indian Administrative Service officer of 1991 batch. He is best known for cancelling the mutation of Sonia Gandhi's son-in-law Robert Vadra's illegal land deal in Gurgaon. 
As of January 2023, he has been transferred 55 times in 30 years by state governments after he exposed corruption in the departments he was posted in. He is a whistleblower of several scams that took place under Bhupinder Hooda's regime, including the Robert Vadra DLF land grab scam, Sonepat-Kharkhoda IMT land scam case, and Garhi Sampla Uddar Gagan land scam. 
Ashok Khemka is Haryana's second-most transferred bureaucrat after another retired IAS officer, Pradeep Kasni, who was transferred 71 times in 35 years.

Early life and education
Ashok Khemka was born in Kolkata, India. He was born in a lower middle class family. His father was a clerk in a jute factory. He graduated from the Indian Institute of Technology Kharagpur in 1988 with a B.Tech degree in Computer Science Engineering and followed it up with a Ph.D in Computer Science from the Tata Institute of Fundamental Research, Mumbai and an MBA degree in Business Administration and Finance. Thereafter, he gave his IAS exams and got selected in the Haryana cadre. He also holds an MA Economics degree from IGNOU. 

He is currently a degree candidate for Bachelor of Laws at Punjab University.

Career
Khemka belongs to the 1991 batch IAS of the Haryana Cadre. He has been repeatedly transferred by various state governments in his home cadre of Haryana after he exposed corruption in the departments he was posted in.

Khemka was posted as Secretary to the Govt. of Haryana, Department of Archives and Archaeology on 4 April 2013. He was also given the charge of DG Archives and Archaeology on 26 April 2013. This was his 45th posting in his 20-year career excluding his 2 year training period. In the previous month, he had exposed a deal that he thought to be untoward and had requested an inquiry by the Central Bureau of Investigation. The government of Haryana refused this and Bhiwani-based NGO filed PIL on the same scam.On 18 October 2013, CBI had registered a preliminary enquiry into the alleged irregularities in the purchase of wheat seeds in HSDC seeking registration of a case against officials of National Cooperative Consumers Federation and National Agriculture Cooperative Marketing Federation for selling seeds at inflated prices to HSDC.

"And the transfer this time was quite humiliating. At 15:30, an officer of the rank of Under Secretary of the government, at least five levels below me, appeared with an order of the Principal Secretary of the Agriculture, appointing him as the MD of the Corporation and asked me to step down," Khemka told news channels. Previously Ashok Khemka was Managing Director in Haryana Seeds Development Corporation.

Chargesheets filed against Ashok Khemka
Two chargesheets for Khemka have been filed, one of which accuses of failing his responsibilities at the Haryana Seed Development Corporation, where Khemka had found corruption and requested for CBI inquiry. Further Khemka quoted that "I have reliably heard that 10 chargesheets will be filed against me on frivolous grounds along with 10 private complaints,". The Haryana government was accused of misusing its authority to penalise Ashok Khemka.

Transfers under Khattar regime 
The transfers continued under the Manohar Lal Khattar-led Bharatiya Janata Party government which came to power in 2014. Khemka was made the transport commissioner in November 2014. But after he launched a drive against overloading and oversized goods vehicles, the truck owners went on strike. His moves to end long existing monopolies controlling private bus operations in the state by opening up private operations to Haryana's unemployed youth also provoked a strike by the state transport undertaking (STU) unions. He was transferred to the archaeology and museums department in April 2015.

In October 2017, Khemka, as the principal secretary, department of social justice and women empowerment had a run-in with his own boss, minister Krishna Bedi over the latter allegedly misusing a department vehicle for over a year. He had also expressed objection to alleged special treatment being given to Khattar's personal staff on the eve of Diwali. In November, he was transferred as the principal secretary in the youth affairs and sports department. In March 2019, he was transferred, for the 52nd time, to Science and Technology Department.

Posting detail
As of March 2019, Khemka has been posted in 51 departments and is currently DG of Archives & Archaeology in Haryana state.

Highlighted Land Deal corruption
Khemka highlighted land deal corruption in Gurgaon and around for conversion of commercial land. Khemka was most recently Haryana's Director-General of Land Consolidation and Land Records-cum-Inspector-General of Registration. During his 80-day stint in the department, Khemka had detected serious irregularities in land transactions involving transfer of panchayat land worth several hundred crores of rupees to newly created real estate companies. Khemka was transferred on 11 October 2012 and he took action on the matter after his transfer. He claims he has been harassed and transferred 40 times in the last 21 years for merely doing his job. As the Managing Director of Haryana Seeds Development Corporation Limited, Khemka exposed its irregularities in just five months as its head following which he was transferred on 4 April 2013 and was replaced by B. S. Duggal, a Deputy Secretary five ranks below him.

Vadra Land Deal
The State Government constituted an Inquiry Committee of three senior IAS officers to nail Khemka on the cancellation of Vadra's land deal in village Sikhohpur (Gurgaon). Khemka responded to the report of the Inquiry Committee in his Comments to the State Government which is divided into 8 Chapters. The specific land deal of Robert Vadra is detailed in Chapter 6.

Rao Inderjit Singh, a member of the Lok Sabha from Gurgaon has said that a detailed inquiry must be conducted to "substantiate or refute" the charges against Robert Vadra, whose business deals with real estate major DLF have been questioned by Ashok Khemka. He said that Mr Vadra's land dealings should be part of a larger investigation into alleged irregular practices in the governments appropriation and sale of nearly 1200 acres.

Death threat 
After raising concerns over the illegal land acquisition of Robert Vadra (Priyanka Gandhi's husband) Khemka alleged that he had received death threats. He had raised a red flag over suspicious land deals between Congress president Sonia Gandhi's son-in-law Robert Vadra.

Awards 
He was awarded the S.R. Jindal Prize in 2011 for "Crusade against Corruption" with a cash prize of ₹10 Lakhs along with Sanjiv Chaturvedi for his efforts in exposing corruption in high places. He also received the Manjunath Shanmugam Trust Commendation on Public Works in 2009.

See also 
 Vijay Shankar Pandey, whistle blower IAS
 Anil Swarup, IAS 
 Sanjiv Chaturvedi, whistle blower IFoS

References

External links 
Official Twitter

1965 births
Living people
Indian Administrative Service officers
Indian government officials
IIT Kharagpur alumni
Tata Institute of Fundamental Research alumni
Indira Gandhi National Open University alumni
People from Kolkata